Guysborough, officially named the Municipality of the District of Guysborough, is a district municipality  in Guysborough County, Nova Scotia, Canada. Statistics Canada classifies the district municipality as a municipal district.

It is home to the Boylston and Salsman Provincial Parks. The parks are located between Boylston and Guysborough.

History
The area was originally called Chedabouctou and was the site of one of a fishing post of Nicolas Denys. In 1682, a permanent settlement was started by Clerbaud Bergier. A group cleared land and spent the winter with the first crops being planted in 1683. Louis-Alexandre des Friches de Meneval landed at Chedabouctou in 1687 when arriving to take up his position as governor of Acadia. The community is named after Sir Guy Carleton.

Geography
Occupying the eastern half of Guysborough County, the district municipality's administrative centre is the community of Guysborough. The district completely surrounds the Town of Mulgrave and it borders the Municipality of the District of St. Mary's to the west, the Municipality of the County of Antigonish to the north and the Strait of Canso to the east.

Demographics

Economy 
Various mining and energy (natural gas) projects have been developed in Guysborough, including around the Southwestern town of Goldboro, Nova Scotia where a $10 Billion liquefied natural gas LNG terminal and pipeline project is being pursued by the Canadian firm Pieridae Energy.

See also
 List of municipalities in Nova Scotia

References

External links

Guysborough
Communities in Guysborough County, Nova Scotia